Tobacco is a common plant.

Tobacco may also refer to:

Tobacco (musician) (born Thomas Fec, 1980), American electronic musician
"Tobacco" (Last Week Tonight with John Oliver), an HBO news satire television series episode
Tobacco (film), a 1962 Bulgarian drama film
Tobacco (tribe), an indigenous Iroquoian people eastern North America

See also
Tabaco, a city in Albay, Philippines
Tabasco (disambiguation)